In Greek mythology, Polyphemus (/ˌpɒlɪˈfiːməs/; Ancient Greek: Πολύφημος Polyphēmos) was a Greek hero and also an Argonaut.

Family 
Polyphemus was the son of Elatus by Hippea, and thus, possibly the brother of Caeneus, Ischys and Ampycus. According to one source, he was married to Laonome, sister of Heracles. In some accounts, Polyphemus was called the beloved of the latter hero.

Mythology 
Polyphemus, as a Lapith, was remembered for having fought against the Centaurs in the days of his youth. In Iliad, Nestor numbers "the godlike Polyphemus" among an earlier generation of heroes of his youth, "the strongest men that Earth has bred, the strongest men against the strongest enemies, a savage mountain-dwelling tribe (i.e. centaur) whom they utterly destroyed." No trace of such an oral tradition, which Homer's listeners would have recognized in Nestor's allusion, survived in literary epic.

Years later, he joined the expedition of the Argonauts. During their stay in Bithynia, Polyphemus was the one to hear Hylas cry as the youth was being dragged away by the nymphs, and when he helped Heracles search for Hylas, both were left behind by the crew of the Argo. Having settled in Mysia, Polyphemus founded the city of Cius, of which he became king. Later, however, he set out to search for his fellow Argonauts and died in the land of the Chalybes. He was buried by the seashore under a poplar tree.

Notes

References 

 Apollonius Rhodius, Argonautica translated by Robert Cooper Seaton (1853-1915), R. C. Loeb Classical Library Volume 001. London, William Heinemann Ltd, 1912. Online version at the Topos Text Project.
 Apollonius Rhodius, Argonautica. George W. Mooney. London. Longmans, Green. 1912. Greek text available at the Perseus Digital Library.
 Gaius Julius Hyginus, Fabulae from The Myths of Hyginus translated and edited by Mary Grant. University of Kansas Publications in Humanistic Studies. Online version at the Topos Text Project.
 Gaius Valerius Flaccus, Argonautica translated by Mozley, J H. Loeb Classical Library Volume 286. Cambridge, MA, Harvard University Press; London, William Heinemann Ltd. 1928. Online version at theio.com.
 Gaius Valerius Flaccus, Argonauticon. Otto Kramer. Leipzig. Teubner. 1913. Latin text available at the Perseus Digital Library.
 Homer, The Iliad with an English Translation by A.T. Murray, Ph.D. in two volumes. Cambridge, MA., Harvard University Press; London, William Heinemann, Ltd. 1924. Online version at the Perseus Digital Library.
 Homer, Homeri Opera in five volumes. Oxford, Oxford University Press. 1920. Greek text available at the Perseus Digital Library.
 Pseudo-Apollodorus, The Library with an English Translation by Sir James George Frazer, F.B.A., F.R.S. in 2 Volumes, Cambridge, MA, Harvard University Press; London, William Heinemann Ltd. 1921. Online version at the Perseus Digital Library. Greek text available from the same website.
Argonauts
Characters in the Argonautica
Lapiths in Greek mythology